Marc Platt may refer to:

Marc Platt (dancer) (1913–2014), American ballet dancer, musical theatre performer, and actor
Marc Platt (producer) (born 1957), American film and theater producer
Mark Platt (rower) (born 1973), Canadian Olympic rower
Marc Platt (writer) (born 1953), British writer

See also
Mark Platts (disambiguation)